Il gobbo (internationally released as The Hunchback of Rome) is a 1960 Italian crime-drama film directed by Carlo Lizzani.  
It is loosely based on the real life events of Giuseppe Albano, an Italian partisan that was one of the protagonists, from 1943 to 1945, of the Roman Resistance against German occupation.

Plot
Alvaro fights during World War II against the Nazis and soon becomes a partisan leader. The other resistance fighters eventually dismiss him because they find his behaviour inacceptable. After the war he doesn't return to a normal life but turns into a foolhardy gangster.

Cast 
Gérard Blain: Alvaro Cosenza
Anna Maria Ferrero: Nina
Pier Paolo Pasolini: Leandro
Bernard Blier: Maresciallo
Nino Castelnuovo: Cencio
Enzo Cerusico: Scheggia
Ivo Garrani: Moretti
Lars Bloch: German torturer
Alex Nicol: U.S. official
Franco Balducci: Pellaccia
Guido Celano

References

External links

1960 films
1960 war films
1960s biographical films
Italian war films
Italian biographical films
Films directed by Carlo Lizzani
Films with screenplays by Ugo Pirro
Films with screenplays by Luciano Vincenzoni
World War II films based on actual events
Films about Italian resistance movement
Italian Campaign of World War II films
Films produced by Dino De Laurentiis
Films scored by Piero Piccioni
Italian World War II films
1960s Italian-language films
1960s Italian films